The Autovía A-57 is a highway in western Spain to the south of Pontevedra.

Sections

References 

A-57
A-57